Gasterosteus is a genus of ray-finned fishes belonging to the family Gasterosteidae, the sticklebacks. These fishes are found in freshwater, brackish water and marine habitats in the Holarctic region.

Species
There are currently 6 recognized species in this genus:
 Gasterosteus aculeatus Linnaeus, 1758 (Three-spined stickleback)
 Gasterosteus crenobiontus Băcescu & R. Mayer, 1956 (Techirghiol stickleback)	
 Gasterosteus islandicus Sauvage, 1874 (Iceland stickleback)
 Gasterosteus microcephalus Girard, 1854 (Smallhead stickleback)
 Gasterosteus nipponicus Higuchi, Sakai & A. Goto, 2014 
 Gasterosteus wheatlandi Putnam, 1867 (Black-spotted stickleback)

Additionally there are a number of fossil species including:
 Gasterosteus kamoensis Nazarkin, Yabumoto & Urabe, 2013

References

 
Gasterosteidae
Ray-finned fish genera
Taxa named by Carl Linnaeus